Xiamen  is a city in Fujian, China.

Xiamen may also refer to: 
Xiamen Special Economic Zone, in Xiamen, Fujian, China
Xiamen dialect, a Hokkien dialect
Xiamen Bay, partially enclosed bay off the coast of Xiamen, China
 Xiamen, an Ethnic Township (民族乡) in Fuding City, Ningde, Fujian 
 Xiamen Town, in Minhe County, Haidong, Qinghai